Feoktistov may refer to:
Konstantin Feoktistov (born 1981), Russian animation director
Konstantin Feoktistov (1926–2009), Soviet aerospace engineer and cosmonaut
Feoktistov (crater), lunar crater named for Konstantin Feoktistov
Stanislav Feoktistov (born 1965), Russian footballer